Kapoor/Kapur is a Khatri clan found in the Punjabi Hindu and Sikh communities.

Notable people
Notable people bearing the name Kapoor include:

Academia

 Anuradha Kapur, professor at National School of Drama
 Deepak Kapur, Distinguished Professor in the Department of Computer Science at the University of New Mexico. 
 Ilan Kapoor,  professor of Critical Development Studies at York University.
 Jagdish Chandra Kapur, Indian social scientist, entrepreneur and the founder of Kapur Surya Foundation 
 Kapil Kapoor, Indian scholar of linguistics and literature and an authority on Indian intellectual traditions in JNU.
 Mahendra Nath Kapur, served as Principal of Modern School, New Delhi, for thirty years. 
 Ratna Kapur, law professor and former director of the Centre for Feminist Legal Research in New Delhi, India
 Shiv G. Kapoor, professor at the University of Illinois
 Sudarshan Kapoor, professor emeritus, California State University 
 Sukhbir Singh Kapoor, Indian writer and educator.
 V.K. Kapoor, Vice Chancellor of Raffles University, Neemrana, Rajasthan.

Activists 

 Jaidev Kapoor, Indian freedom fighter who worked for the Hindustan Republican Association along with Chandra Shekhar Azad
 Nita Kapoor, Indian-Norwegian activist. She has worked extensively with immigrants' issues in Norway and women's issues globally.
 Shruti Kapoor, Indian economist, women's rights activist, and social entrepreneur.

Army 

 General Deepak Kapoor, chief of Army staff, Indian Army
 H. L. Kapur, former Air Vice Marshal of Indian Air Force and a member of the Indian National Congress
 Raj Kumar Kapoor, former colonel in Indian Army
 Sanjeev Kapoor (air marshal), Air Marshal in the Indian Air Force. Currently, he is serving as the director general – Inspection and Flight Safety

Artists

 Anish Kapoor, British - Indian sculptor, creator of Cloud Gate
 Atul Kapoor, voice artist who gave the voice of Bigg Boss 
 Anita Kapoor.  hosted shows on Discovery, TLC, Channel NewsAsia, okto and AXN.
 D. S. Kapoor, art historian and educator.
 Gaurav Kapur, Indian cricket presenter
 Geeta Kapur, noted Indian art critic, art historian and curator based in New Delhi. She was one of the pioneers of critical art writing
 Mohan Kapur, voice artist who gave the Hindi voice of the MCU's Dr. Strange

Authors 

 Kanhaiya Lal Kapoor, Urdu satirist
 Manju Kapur, Punjabi novelist.
 Narinder Singh Kapoor, Punjabi writer
 Pramod Kapoor (born 1953), Indian writer and publisher

Bureaucrats and politicians 

 Ajay Kapoor (politician), MLA in Uttar Pradesh
 Anita Kapur, Indian IRS officer. She is former Chairperson of the Central Board of Direct Taxes (CBDT)
 Harbans Kapoor, BJP Senior politician
 Jaspat Roy Kapoor, Indian politician. He was a Member of Parliament, representing Uttar Pradesh.
 Kishan Kapoor, Indian politician and the member of BJP. He is the sitting Member of parliament, Lok Sabha from Kangra Lok Sabha
 Mudassar Kapur, Pakistani-Norwegian politician
 Pavan Kapoor, Indian diplomat and current Indian Ambassador to Russia.
 Pooja Kapur, Indian Ambassador to the Kingdom of Denmark. She was formerly the Indian Ambassador to the Republic of Bulgaria and North Macedonia
 Sanjay Kapoor (politician), Indian Congress politician and a member of the 16th Legislative Assembly of Uttar Pradesh 
 Sat Pal Kapur, Indian politician in Patiala, Punjab.
 Savita Kapoor. Indian politician and the MLA from Dehradun Cantonment Assembly. She is a member of the Bharatiya Janata Party. 
 Sheila Kapur Dikshit, longest serving Chief Minister of Delhi.
 Vijai Kapoor, former IAS officer and was Lieutenant Governor of Delhi. 
 Yashpal Kapur, leader of Indian National Congress and a close aide of Indira Gandhi.

Businessmen 

 Amit Kapur, American-born internet entrepreneur. He is the co-founder of WhoCo and Gravity. Served as COO of MySpace
 B. K. Kapur, Indian businessman and was the chairman of Hindustan Aeronautics Limited
 John Kapoor, an American multi-millionaire, pharmaceutical entrepreneur, former CEO of Insys Therapeutics
 Rakesh Kapoor, an Indian businessman. Ex- chief executive (CEO) of Reckitt Benckiser which is the parent company of  Dettol, Strepsils, Veet, Airborne, Mortein, Air Wick
 Rakhee Kapoor Tandon, Indian business entrepreneur and venture capitalist. She is one of "India's 25 Most Influential Women", according to India Today.
 Rana Kapoor, founder of Yes Bank
 Ritu Kapur,  CEO of Quintillion Media, which jointly owns BloombergQuint with Bloomberg L.P. She is the co-founder of The Quint and Network18.
 Subhash Kapoor, Indian art dealer
 Vikas Kapoor, CEO of Mezocliq

Chefs 

 Kunal Kapur, Indian celebrity chef and restaurateur known for hosting and judging MasterChef India.
 Sanjeev Kapoor, Indian celebrity chef

Directors and producers 

 Bharat Kapoor, director, writer, producer
 Boney Kapoor film director and producer, son of Surinder Kapoor
 Rajit Kapur, Indian film and theater actor and director
 Rhea Kapoor, Bollywood film producer, daughter of Anil Kapoor
 Nitin Kapoor, Indian producer
 Shekhar Kapur, Indian film-maker
 Shobha Kapoor, Indian television and film producer
 Siddharth Roy Kapur, Bollywood actor and producer
 Subhash Kapoor, Indian film director, producer and screenwriter
 Surinder Kapoor, Bollywood film producer

Film actors

 Abhishek Kapoor, Indian film actor, writer.
 Abhinav Kapoor, Indian actor

 Aditya Raj Kapoor, Indian film actor and filmmaker from the Kapoor family
 Aditya Roy Kapur, Bollywood actor
 Akshay Kapoor, Indian actor
 Akshita Kapoor, Indian actress
 Anil Kapoor, Bollywood actor, film producer, son of Surinder Kapoor
 Anupriya Kapoor, Indian television actress
 Anu Kapoor, Bollywood actor
 Annu Kapoor, Bollywood actor
 Arjun Kapoor, Bollywood actor, son of Boney Kapoor and Mona Shourie Kapoor
 Ayesha Kapur, German former actress of Indian descent
 Babita Kapoor, former Bollywood actress, wife of Randhir Kapoor
 Dhiraj Vinod Kapoor, Indian model and actor
 Ekta Kapoor producer for television and movies (Bollywood)
 Gautami Kapoor, Indian television actress and model
 Goga Kapoor, Indian film actor
 Jayasudha Kapoor, South Indian film actress, wife of Nitin Kapoor
 Jeetendra Kapoor, Bollywood actor
 Kamal Kapoor, Bollywood actor
 Karan Kapoor, Indian film actor and model, son of Shashi Kapoor
 Kareena Kapoor, Bollywood actress
 Karisma Kapoor, Bollywood actress
 Kishore Namit Kapoor, Indian actor and film-acting trainer
 Kunal Kapoor (actor, born 1959), Bollywood Actor, son of Shashi Kapoor
 Kunal Kapoor (actor, born 1977), Bollywood Actor
 Kunal Karan Kapoor, Indian television actor
 Kunaal Roy Kapur, Bollywood actor
 Mallika Kapoor, South Indian film actress
 Neha Kapur, Femina Miss India Universe 2006
 Omkar Kapoor, Bollywood actor
 Pankaj Kapur, Bollywood actor, film-maker
 Pinchoo Kapoor, Indian actor
 Prithviraj Kapoor, Indian theatre and Hindi film industry entrepreneur, patriarch of the Kapoor family of entertainers
 Raj Kapoor, Bollywood actor, producer and director, son of Prithviraj Kapoor
 Rajat Kapoor, Indian actor, writer and director
 Rajiv Kapoor, Bollywood actor, son of Raj Kapoor
 Ram Kapoor, TV actor and model
 Ranbir Kapoor, Bollywood actor, son of Rishi Kapoor
 Randhir Kapoor, Bollywood actor, son of Raj Kapoor
 Ravi Kapoor, British actor
 Ashish Kapoor, Indian Bollywood and television actor
 Rishi Kapoor, Bollywood actor, son of Raj Kapoor
 Sanjana Kapoor, Bollywood actress, theatre-person, owner of Prithvi Theatre
 Sanjay Kapoor, Bollywood actor, son of Surinder Kapoor
 Shahid Kapoor, Bollywood actor, son of Pankaj Kapur
 Shakti Kapoor, Bollywood actor
 Shalini Kapoor, Indian actress
 Shammi Kapoor, Bollywood actor
 Sharad Kapoor, Indian actor, who works in Hindi movies and television
 Shraddha Kapoor, Bollywood actress, daughter of Shakti Kapoor
 Shashi Kapoor, Indian actor
 Shivani Kapoor, British model
 Shobu Kapoor, British actress of Indian descent
 Siddhanth Kapoor, Indian actor and assistant director, son of Shakti Kapoor
 Sonam Kapoor, Bollywood actress
 Sonia Kapoor, Indian television actress
 Sridevi Kapoor, Indian actress and film producer
 Trilok Kapoor, Indian film actor, brother of Prithviraj Kapoor
 Tusshar Kapoor, Bollywood actor
 Vaani Kapoor, Indian actress and model
 Vinod Kapoor, played the role of Dushasana in the Indian TV serial Mahabharat

Journalists 

 Akash Kapur,  Indian-American journalist and author.
 Coomi Kapoor, Contributing Editor of the Indian Express.

Science and technology 

 Anuja Trehan Kapur, criminal psychologist
 Kishen Singh Kapoor, mathematician, author and a teacher.
 Raman Kapur, Indian medical acupuncturist, author and the president of the Indian Society of Medical Acupuncture. 
 Shalini Kapoor, innovator and CTO (chief technology officer) for IBM AI Application.
 Shyam Sunder Kapoor, Indian nuclear physicist and a former director of Bhabha Atomic Research Centre. Known for his research on fission and heavy-ion physics,

Singers and dancers 

 Geeta Kapoor, Indian choreographer and television personality.
 Himani Kapoor, Indian singer and finalist of Sa Re Ga Ma Pa Challenge 2005.
 Kanika Kapoor, singer
 Mahendra Kapoor, Indian playback singer who sang "Mere Desh ki Dharti".
 Meena Kapoor. Indian playback singer
 Raman Kapoor, Indian singer and songwriter. He was a contestant on the TV shows Sa Re Ga Ma Pa and Rising Star.
 Sidhant Kapoor. Indian classical musician
 Sneha Kapoor, Indian salsa dancer, choreographer, and instructor. She is popularly known as "The Indian Salsa Princess".
 Steven Kapur, also known as "Apache Indian", pop singer

Sportspersons 

 Aashish Kapoor, Indian cricketer
 Jagdish Singh Kapoor, Ugandan field hockey player. He competed in the men's tournament at the 1972 Summer Olympics.
 Kunal Kapoor (cricketer), Indian cricketer
 Raag Kapur, Hong Kong cricketer
Ranjin Singh (Dave Kapoor), "Dave Kapoor" pro-wrestler wrestling as "Ranjin Singh"
Raunaq Kapur, Hong Kong cricketer
Rohan Kapoor, Indian badminton player with the highest international ranking of 34 in Mixed Doubles
Shiv Kapur, Asian Games gold medalist in Golf
Sushil Kapoor, Indian cricketer
Upkar Singh Kapoor, Ugandan field hockey player. He competed in the men's tournament at the 1972 Summer Olympics.
Vani Kapoor,  Indian golfer.who won the fifth leg of the 2020 Hero Women's Pro Golf Tour.

Fictional characters
 Gita Kapoor, a character in the British TV drama EastEnders
 Kelly Kapoor, a character in the US TV show The Office
 Sanjay Kapoor (EastEnders), a character in the British TV drama EastEnders
 Sharmilla Kapoor, a character in the British TV drama EastEnders
Ajay Kapoor (Neighbours), a character in the soap opera Neighbours
Priya Kapoor, a character in the soap opera Neighbours
Rani Kapoor, a character in the soap opera Neighbours

See also 

 Garhi Kapoora, town in Mardan, Khyber Pakhtunkhwa
 Kapurpur, Pakistan

References

Indian surnames
Khatri clans
Khatri surnames
Surnames of Indian origin
Punjabi-language surnames
Hindu surnames